The Gangs of New York: An Informal History of the Underworld is an American non-fiction book by Herbert Asbury, first published in 1927 by Garden City Publishing Company.

The novel's U.S. copyright expired on January 1, 2023, when all works published in 1927 entered the public domain.

Description

The book details the rise and fall of 19th century gangs in New York City, prior to the domination of the Italian-American Mafia during Prohibition in the 1920s. Focusing on the saloon halls, gambling dens, and winding alleys of the Bowery and the Five Points district of Lower Manhattan, the book evokes the destitution and violence of a turbulent era, when colorfully named criminals like "Dandy" Johnny Dolan, William Poole (also known as Bill the Butcher), and Hell-Cat Maggie lurked in the shadows, and infamous gangs including the Plug Uglies, Dead Rabbits, and Bowery Boys ruled the streets. It includes a rogues' gallery of prostitutes, pimps, poisoners, pickpockets, murderers, and thieves.

The book contains detailed accounts of the New York City draft riots in 1863. It also elaborates on numerous other criminal influences of the time, including river pirates and the corrupt political establishment such as Tammany Hall.

Adaptation
The book was loosely adapted into the epic historical drama film Gangs of New York (2002) by director Martin Scorsese.

See also

 Books about New York City
 History of New York City
 List of non-fiction works made into feature films

References

External links
 
 Comparison of the book and movie at herbertasbury.com

1928 non-fiction books
19th century in New York (state)
Books about New York City
Non-fiction books adapted into films
English-language books
Five Points, Manhattan
Former gangs in New York City
History books about the 19th century
Non-fiction books about organized crime
Works about Irish-American organized crime